Vachel Almshouses is a terrace of almshouses in the town of Reading in the English county of Berkshire.

History 

In 1634 almshouses were built in St Mary's Butts, which were called 'St Mary's Almshouses'. The almshouses were built by Thomas Vachel. A plaque fixed on the building reads:

They were demolished in 1867 and replaced with new buildings at a new location in Castle Hill, with money coming from the sale of the land. The new almshouses were renamed Vachel Almshouses after Thomas Vachel. They were designed by architect William Henry Woodman. The Almshouses were modernised in 1960–62.

References

External links 

Grade II listed buildings in Reading
Residential buildings completed in 1867
Grade II listed almshouses
Almshouses in Berkshire